The 2014–15 National League 2 South is the sixth season (28th overall) of the fourth tier (south) of the English domestic rugby union competitions since the professionalised format of the second division was introduced. New teams to the division include Worthing Raiders (relegated from National League 1), Dorking and Old Elthamians (both promoted from National League 3 London & SE) and Lydney (promoted from National League 3 South West).  The league system is 4 points for a win, 2 points for a draw and additional bonus points being awarded for scoring 4 or more tries and/or losing within 7 points of the victorious team.  In terms of promotion the league champions would go straight up into National League 1 while the runners up would have a one-game playoff against the runners up from National League 2 North (at the home ground of the club with the superior league record) for the final promotion place.  

During the course of the season the two league derby games between the Launceston and Redruth would also double up as the Cornish Super Cup with Launceston being the defending 2013–14 champions. Redruth won over two razor edge contests to take the 2014–15 Cornish Super Cup 29 – 28 on aggregate. Henley Hawks finished the season as champions and booked themselves an immediate return to National League 1 for the 2015–16 season by securing the league title and promotion on 28 March 2015, beating Shelford 66 – 17 at Dry Leas.

While Henley gained promotion early, the battle for second spot (and the chance to go up via the play-off) went right to the last day of the season with three teams looking to go up — Bishop's Stortford, Dorking and Taunton Titans. In the end, all three teams had bonus point victories but Bishop's Stortford's slender two point lead at the start of play meant they would finish as league runners–up. With only three victories all season Dings Crusaders were the first team to be relegated, followed some time later by Shelford with the third relegation spot much more keenly contested. A dramatic last day saw Lydney competing against Southend Saxons to avoid the drop. Lydney won their game with the maximum 5 points they needed but Southend managed to get a losing bonus point in their game and stayed up thanks to a better win record.  Dings and Lydney would drop to National League 3 South West while Shelford would drop to National League 3 London & SE.

League runners up Bishop's Stortford would go into a playoff against the runners up of the 2014–15 National League 2 North, Ampthill, with Ampthill getting home advantage due to their better league record.  It was the second time in a row that Ampthill were in the playoffs after somewhat ironically finishing second in National League 2 South the previous season.  Bishop's Stortford lost a close game at Dillingham Park 10-19, with Ampthill gaining promotion to National League 1 for the 2015-16 season.  In terms of attendances, National League 2 South had a total of 94,033 fans turning up for games across the season - up 14,405 from the previous season.  This was helped by good regular crowds at Launceston and Redruth with 1,000+ attendances in the matches between the two Cornish sides while the two Cambridge - Shelford derby games attracted the biggest crowds of the season.

Structure
The league consists of sixteen teams with all the teams playing each other on a home and away basis to make a total of thirty matches each. There is one automatic promotion place, one play-off place and three relegation places. The champions are promoted to 2015–16 National League 1 and the runners-up play the second-placed team in the 2014–15 National League 2 North with the winner being promoted. The last three teams are relegated to either National League 3 London & SE or National League 3 South West depending on the geographical location of the team (in some cases teams may join the Midlands regional leagues).

Participating teams
Eleven of the teams listed below participated in the 2013–14 National League 2 South season; Henley Hawks and Worthing Raiders were relegated from National League 1, Dorking (champions) and Old Elthamians (play-offs) were promoted from National League 3 London & SE, Lydney were promoted from National League 3 South West and Ampthill were transferred back to National League 2 North to ensure that both leagues were suitably balanced with the same number of teams.

Final league table

Results

Round 1

Round 2

Round 3

Round 4

Round 5

Round 6

Round 7

Round 8

Round 9

Round 10

Postponed due to waterlogged pitch.  Game to be replayed on 28 February 2015.

Round 11

Round 12

Round 13

Round 14

Round 15

Round 16

Round 17

Round 18

Round 19

Postponed after a referee's assessment due to wet weather conditions rendering pitch unplayable.  Game to be replayed on 28 February 2015.

Round 20

Round 21

Postponed due to snow.  Game to be replayed on 28 February 2015.

Round 22

Round 23

Round 24

Rounds 10, 19 & 21 (rescheduled matches)

Round 25

Round 26

Round 27

Round 28

Round 29

Round 30

Promotion play-off
Each season, the runners-up in the National League 2 South and National League 2 North participate in a play-off for promotion into National Division 1. Ampthill were runners-up in the North and because they had a better record than the South runners-up, Bishop's Stortford they hosted the play-off match.

Total season attendances

Individual statistics 

 Note that points scorers includes tries as well as conversions, penalties and drop goals.  Appearance figures also include coming on as substitutes (unused substitutes not included).

Top points scorers

Top try scorers

Season records

Team
Largest home win — 58 pts
63 - 5 Henley Hawks at home to Dings Crusaders on 6 December 2014
Largest away win — 40 pts
54 – 14 Bishop's Stortford away to Shelford on 14 February 2015
Most points scored — 66 pts
66 - 17 Henley Hawks at home to Shelford on 28 March 2015
Most tries in a match — 12
Henley Hawks at home to Shelford on 28 March 2015
Most conversions in a match — 7 (x4)
Worthing Raiders at home to Lydney on 24 January 2015
Bishop's Stortford away to Shelford on 14 February 2015
Henley Hawks at home to Shelford on 28 March 2015
Dorking away to Shelford on 11 April 2015
Most penalties in a match — 7 
Launceston away to Dings Crusaders on 27 September 2014
Most drop goals in a match — 2
Taunton Titans away to Worthing Raiders on 4 October 2014

Player
Most points in a match — 27
 Charles Foley for Clifton away to Shelford on 17 January 2015
Most tries in a match — 4 (x3)
 Ruben Haile for Chinnor at home to Southend Saxons on 11 October 2014
 Joe Collingham for Cambridge away to Southend Saxons on 9 November 2014
 Lloyd Owen for Henley Hawks at home to Dings Crusaders on 6 December 2014
Most conversions in a match — 7 (x2)
 Matthew McLean for Worthing Raiders at home to Lydney on 24 January 2015
 James Combden for Henley Hawks at home to Shelford on 28 March 2015
Most penalties in a match — 7 
 Kieron Lewitt for Launceston away to Dings Crusaders on 27 September 2014
Most drop goals in a match — 1
N/A - multiple players

Attendances
Highest — 1,687    
Cambridge against Shelford on 10 January 2014
Lowest — 75  
Clifton against Southend on 15 November 2014
Highest Average Attendance — 780
Redruth
Lowest Average Attendance — 180
Clifton

See also
 English rugby union system
 Rugby union in England

References

External links
 NCA Rugby

2014–15
2014–15 in English rugby union leagues